Kuzma is an uninhabited settlement in Croatia. The highest population was in 1931 when it had 295 settlers.

References

Ghost towns in Croatia